Ehrman Syme Nadal, A.M. (1843–1922) was an American author, born at Lewisburg, West Virginia. He graduated from Yale in 1864. His employment included serving as second secretary of the United States Legation at London in the 1870s, being on the staff of the New York Nation for several years in the 1880s, and lecturing on English composition at Columbia in 1892–1893. His publications include: Impressions of London Social Life (1875); Essays at Home and Elsewhere (1882); and Zwieback: Notes of a Professional Exile (1895).

19th-century American journalists
American male journalists
American essayists
Yale College alumni
People from Lewisburg, West Virginia
1843 births
1922 deaths
Writers from West Virginia
Journalists from West Virginia
American male essayists
19th-century American male writers
19th-century essayists
American expatriates in the United Kingdom